Fujiwara no Atsunobu (藤原 敦信; fl. early 11th century CE) was a Japanese nobleman and writer of both waka and kanshi poetry.

Life 
Fujiwara no Atsunobu was born to Fujiwara no Aishige (藤原敦信), a member of the Shikike branch of the Fujiwara clan, and a daughter of Minamoto no Hitoshi. The year of his birth is unknown.

During the reign of Emperor En'yū, he became a student Chinese literature (文章生 monjōshō) at the Imperial University.

The record of the Dajō Daijin-den Sanjikkō Uta-awase (太政大臣殿三十講歌合), dating from the fifth month of Chōho 5 (1003 in the Julian calendar) calls him "the former governor of Higo" (前肥後守). The , the diary of Fujiwara no Michinaga, records that in the fourth month of Kankō 4 (1007) he was invited to a private banquet (密宴 mitsuen) at the Inner Palace, to which he contributed Chinese poetry.

He fathered the Confucianist and kanshi poet Fujiwara no Akihira. According to a document (奏状 sōjō) presented by Akihira to the emperor, his father was unfortunate in his later years, and became a Buddhist monk.

Poetry 

Notes

References

Citations

Works cited 

 
 
 

Waka poets
Kanshi poets
10th-century Japanese poets
11th-century Japanese poets
Kuge
Year of birth unknown
Year of death unknown